Chehregan Rural District is in Tasuj District of Shabestar County, East Azerbaijan province, Iran. At the National Census of 2006, its population was 3,509 in 1,037 households. There were 3,171 inhabitants in 1,053 households at the following census of 2011. At the most recent census of 2016, the population of the rural district was 2,981 in 1,088 households. The largest of its seven villages was Chehregan, with 1,297 people.

References 

Shabestar County

Rural Districts of East Azerbaijan Province

Populated places in East Azerbaijan Province

Populated places in Shabestar County